The 2022   Chile Open (also known as the Chile Dove Men+Care Open for sponsorship reasons) was a men's tennis tournament played on outdoor clay courts. It was the 24th edition of the Chile Open, and part of the ATP 250 of the 2022 ATP Tour. It took place in Santiago, Chile from 21 through 27 February 2022.

Champions

Singles 

  Pedro Martínez def.  Sebastián Báez, 4–6, 6–4, 6–4

Doubles 

  Rafael Matos /  Felipe Meligeni Alves def.  André Göransson /  Nathaniel Lammons, 7–6(10–8), 7–6(7–3).

Point and prize money

Point distribution

Prize money 

*per team

Singles main draw entrants

Seeds 

 Rankings are as of February 14, 2022.

Other entrants 
The following players received wildcards into the singles main draw:
  Nicolás Jarry
  Thiago Seyboth Wild 
  Alejandro Tabilo

The following players received entry using a protected ranking into the singles main draw:
  Yannick Hanfmann

The following players received entry from the qualifying draw:
  Gonzalo Lama 
  Juan Ignacio Londero 
  Renzo Olivo 
  Matheus Pucinelli de Almeida

The following player received entry as a lucky loser:
  Nicolás Kicker

Withdrawals
  Roberto Carballés Baena → replaced by  Nicolás Kicker 
  Casper Ruud → replaced by  Bernabé Zapata Miralles
  Dominic Thiem → replaced by  Daniel Elahi Galán

Doubles main draw entrants

Seeds

 Rankings are as of February 14, 2022.

Other entrants
The following pairs received wildcards into the doubles main draw:
  Tomás Martín Etcheverry /  Juan Ignacio Londero
  Gonzalo Lama /  Alejandro Tabilo

The following pairs received entry as alternates:
  Sergio Galdós /  Juan Pablo Varillas
  Yannick Hanfmann /  Fernando Romboli
  Zdeněk Kolář /  Nikola Milojević

Withdrawals 
Before the tournament
  Roberto Carballés Baena /  Federico Coria → replaced by  Sergio Galdos /  Juan Pablo Varillas
  Marco Cecchinato /  Carlos Taberner → replaced by  Zdeněk Kolář /  Nikola Milojević
  Marcelo Demoliner /  Luis David Martínez → replaced by  Miomir Kecmanović /  Luis David Martínez
  Máximo González /  Nicolás Jarry → replaced by  Yannick Hanfmann /  Fernando Romboli
During the tournament
  Facundo Bagnis /  Jaume Munar
  Federico Delbonis /  Guillermo Durán

References

External links 
 

Chile Open
Chile Open (tennis)
Chile Open
Chile Open